The 2019–20 season was Blackburn Rovers' 132nd season as a professional football club and it participated in the Championship for a second consecutive season. Along with competing in the Championship, the club also participated in the FA Cup and the EFL Cup. The season covered the period from 1 July 2019 to 22 July 2020.

Summer activity

May

On 11 May, Rovers announced that young defender Matthew Platt had signed a new one-year contract with the club until the summer of 2020.

On 14 May, Rovers reached decisions regarding players whose contracts are due to expire on 30 June.

Goalkeeper Jayson Leutwiler has been informed that the option to extend his registration by a further year to June 2020 has been taken up by the club.

Discussions are currently taking place with Craig Conway, Jack Rodwell and Ben Gladwin regarding the possibility of extending their stays at Ewood Park.

Paul Downing, Jack Doyle, Lewis Mansell, Charlie Albinson, George Wilson (scholar) and Kyle Connell (scholar) will not be retained by the club upon the expiration of their current contracts at the end of next month.

On 25 May, Craig Conway announced via his Twitter account  that he would be departing the club at the end of his current contract, bringing an end to his 5 & half year stay at the club.

June

On 13 June, Partick Thistle announced Lewis Mansell will join the club on 1 July when his Rovers contract ends, Mansell had previously been on loan at the club.

On 21 June, Rovers announced their first signing of the summer, midfielder Stuart Downing will join the club on 1 July when his Middlesbrough contract ends, he's signed a 12-month contract until 2020. On the same day, Portsmouth announced Paul Downing will join the club on 1 July when his Rovers contract ends.

On 30 June 2019 Jack Rodwell and Ben Gladwin's contracts expired without any agreement on new contracts. As such they are free agents.

July

On 1 July, Rovers announced the signing of 19 year old goalkeeper Joe Hilton following his release from Everton on a 2-year deal, he'll initially link up with the u23s.

On 2 July, Rovers announced under 23s head coach Damien Johnson has been promoted to the role of first team technical coach and head of player development.

On 5 July, Rovers announced the signing of midfielder Bradley Johnson from Derby County on a free transfer, he's signed a 2-year deal.

On 6 July, Rovers announced that goalkeeper David Raya had joined Brentford for an undisclosed fee. It was also revealed that Charlie Adam had been training with the club and he featured for Rovers in the second half of the friendly match against Barrow. Derby County midfielder Jacob Butterfield was also revealed to be training with the club.

On 9 July, Rovers announced the signing of young midfielder Tom White from Gateshead on a 2-year deal, he will initially link up with the u23s.

On 13 July, Rovers announced the signing of Southampton striker Sam Gallagher for an undisclosed fee, on a four-year-deal. Also Southport announced the signing of goalkeeper Charlie Albinson following his release from Rovers.

On 22 July, Rovers announced that midfielder Lewis Travis had signed a new 4-year contract until 2023, with the option of a further 12 months.

On 23 July, Rovers announced that goalkeeper Christian Walton had joined on loan until the end of the season from Brighton & Hove Albion.

On 26 July, Rovers announced that defender Scott Wharton had signed a new deal until 2022 & joined Northampton Town on loan until the end of the season.

On 29 July, it was announced that Under-13 lead coach George Boateng had joined Aston Villa to take up a position as Under-18 lead coach.

On 31 July, Rovers announced that defender Tosin Adarabioyo had joined on loan until the end of the season from Manchester City.

August

On 1 August Southport announced the signing of defender Jack Doyle following his release from Rovers. Rovers also announced striker Joe Nuttall had joined Blackpool for undisclosed fee.

On 8 August Rovers announced that defender Tyler Magloire had joined Rochdale on loan until the end of the season, Rovers also announced defender Greg Cunningham had joined on loan from Cardiff City until the end of the season.

On 9 August Rovers announced that defender Charlie Mulgrew had joined Wigan Athletic on loan until the end of the season.

On 19 August Rovers announced under 18s head coach Billy Barr had been promoted to head coach of the under 23s & Mike Sheron has agreed to take over as the new under 18s lead coach, having spent several seasons as professional development phase assistant coach at the club.

On 23 August Rovers announced goalkeeper Andy Fisher had joined Northampton Town on loan until 1January 2020.

On 30 August Rovers announced that defender Matthew Platt had joined Barrow on loan until the end of the season,

September

On 13 September Rovers announced young defender Andy Jackson had joined Clitheroe on a months loan.

On 19 September Rovers announced the signing of attacking midfielder Lewis Holtby following his release from Hamburg on 2-year deal.

October

On 4 October Rovers announced young forward Jack Vale had signed a long-term contract at the club until 2023.

November

On 15 November Rovers announced that defender Tom White had joined Barrow on loan until January.

Winter activity

December

January

On 2 January Rovers announced midfielder Ben Gladwin & defender Andy Jackson had been released.

On 10 January Milton Keynes Dons announced the signing of Ben Gladwin following his release from Rovers.

On 13 January Rovers announced midfielder Tom White had extended his loan at Barrow until the end of the season, Rovers also announced young defender Isaac Whitehall had signed a long-term contract at the club until 2022.

On 15 January Rovers announced defender Charlie Mulgrew had returned to the club from a loan spell at Wigan Athletic at the players request.

On 17 January Rovers announced defender Greg Cunningham had returned to parent club Cardiff City, Rovers also announced defender Sam Hart had joined Shrewsbury Town on loan until the end of the season.

On 29 January Rovers announced defender Tyler Magloire had been recalled from his loan from Rochdale.

On 31 January Rovers announced goalkeeper Andy Fisher had joined Milton Keynes Dons on loan until the end of the season.

February

On 1 February Rovers signed winger D'Margio Wright-Phillips on a youth loan from Manchester City until the end of the season, he is the son of Shaun Wright-Phillips.

March

On 5 March Rovers announced young striker Jack Vale had joined Barrow on loan until the end of the season, Rovers also announced young left back Lewis Thompson had joined AFC Fylde on loan until the end of the season.

On 13 March The EFL announced the season was suspended until 3 April 2020, due to the COVID-19 pandemic, Also Rovers announced young defender Jake Garrett had signed his 1st professional contract at the club until 2022.

April

May

June

On 9 June Rovers announced young central defender Hayden Carter & young left back Lewis Thompson had signed new contracts, Carter signed a 2 year contract until 2022 & Thompson signed a 1 year contract until 2021. Rovers also announced fellow academy graduates Jack Evans & Charley Doyle will not be retained by the club when their contracts expire at the end of the month.

On 15 June Rovers announced Scott Wharton will remain on loan at Northampton Town to play in the League Two playoffs.

On 19 June Rovers announced Christian Walton will remain on loan until the end of the extended season.

On 24 June Rovers announced their retained list Danny Graham, Stewart Downing, Dominic Samuel, Jayson Leutwiler, Richie Smallwood & Sam Hart have all signed contract extensions until the end of the current extended season & discussions will be held regarding their future at the club beyond the season.

From the development squad Rovers took the option to extend Matthew Platt contract by 12 months until 2021, whilst Brad Lyons & Ben Paton have both been offered new contracts, Jordan Eastham has signed a contract till 2022 while Sam Burns, Dan Pike, Jalil Saadi, Sam Durrant & James Connelly have signed contracts until 2021. Luke Brennan & Flavien Enzo Boyomo have been offered professional contracts but have yet to sign. Chanka Zimba, Jack Evans & Charley Doyle will not be retained by the club while D'Margio Wright-Phillips has returned to parent club Manchester City.

On 29 June Rovers announced Tosin Adarabioyo will remain on loan until the end of the extended season.

July

On 21 July Rovers announced Adam Armstrong's goal against Cardiff City had been voted goal of the season.

On 22 July Rovers announced Adam Armstrong had been voted player of the season.

On 23 July Rovers announced John Buckley had won young player of the year & Lewis Travis had won the Peter Jackson man of the match award.

Squad information

Pre-season and friendlies

Pre-season
Blackburn Rovers announced six pre-season friendlies against National League North's Barrow, EFL League One's Rochdale, newly promoted side Bury, and Blackpool, EFL League Two's Mansfield Town, and Scottish Premiership side Rangers.

Mid-season

Championship season

League table

Matchday
On Thursday, 20 June 2019, the EFL Championship fixtures were revealed.

EFL Cup

The first round draw was made on 20 June. The second round draw was made on 13 August 2019 following the conclusion of all but one first round matches.

FA Cup

Backroom staff

1st Team squad statistics

|-
|colspan="14"|Players out on loan:  

|-
|colspan="14"|Players that played for Blackburn Rovers this season that have left the club: 

|}

Goalscorers

Transfers

Summer

Transfers in 

Total outgoing: +/- ~£

Transfers out

Trial period with club 

Total incoming: +/- ~£ 0 *(£3 million figure suggested for Raya transfer)

Loans in

Loans out

Winter

Transfers in 

Total outgoing: +/- ~£

Transfers out 

Total incoming: +/- ~£ 0

Loans in

Loans out

References

Blackburn Rovers F.C. seasons
Blackburn Rovers